Höskuldur Gunnlaugsson (born 26 September 1994) is an Icelandic football midfielder, who currently plays for Breiðablik.

International career
Höskuldur has played for the Iceland U21 national team.

References

External links

1994 births
Living people
Hoskuldur Gunnlaugsson
Hoskuldur Gunnlaugsson
Hoskuldur Gunnlaugsson
Hoskuldur Gunnlaugsson
Association football midfielders
Hoskuldur Gunnlaugsson
Halmstads BK players
Hoskuldur Gunnlaugsson
Allsvenskan players
Hoskuldur Gunnlaugsson
Expatriate footballers in Sweden